Govindasamy Rajasekaran (born 1941 or 1942) is a Malaysian former trade union leader.

Rajasekaran was the founding general secretary of the Malaysian Metal Industry Employees' Union in 1963.  The union affiliated to the Malaysian Trade Union Congress (MTUC), of which Rajasekaran was elected as deputy general secretary in 1980, and then general secretary in 1992.

The MTUC was in turn affiliated to the International Confederation of Free Trade Unions (ICFTU), and Rajasekaran was elected as president of the ICFTU Asia and Pacific Regional Organisation in 2005.  Under his leadership, it merged with the Brotherhood of Asian Trade Unions to form the ITUC-Asia Pacific, and Rajasekaran remained president until his retirement, in 2015.

References

1940s births
Living people
Malaysian trade unionists